UFC Fight Night: Whittaker vs. Brunson (also known as UFC Fight Night 101) was a mixed martial arts event produced by the Ultimate Fighting Championship held on November 27, 2016, at Rod Laver Arena in Melbourne, Victoria, Australia.

Background
This event was the second that the organization hosted in Melbourne, with the first being UFC 193 in November 2015.

The event was expected to be headlined by a middleweight rematch between former Strikeforce and UFC Middleweight Champion Luke Rockhold and former Strikeforce Middleweight Champion Ronaldo Souza. The duo first met in September 2011 at Strikeforce: Barnett vs. Kharitonov, in which Rockhold won a unanimous decision to capture Souza's title. However, on November 1, Rockhold was ruled out of the contest due to a sprained ACL. Subsequently, Souza was removed from the card entirely and is expected to be rescheduled for another event. In turn, a middleweight bout between The Ultimate Fighter: The Smashes welterweight winner Robert Whittaker and Derek Brunson was elevated to serve as the event headliner.

As a result of the cancellation of UFC Fight Night: Lamas vs. Penn, bouts between Yao Zhikui vs. Jenel Lausa and Seo Hee Ham vs. Danielle Taylor were rescheduled for this event.

On October 21, it was announced that Dominique Steele pulled out of his scheduled bout against Kyle Noke due to an undisclosed injury and was replaced by Omari Akhmedov.

The Ultimate Fighter: China featherweight winner Ning Guangyou was expected to face Marlon Vera at UFC 202. However, due to an out-of-competition failed test and following investigation concluding Ning ingested the substance without fault or negligence, the bout was moved to UFC on Fox: Maia vs. Condit. In turn, the bout was postponed again due to alleged visa issues for Ning, which restricted the timing of his travel. The fight was later rescheduled for this event.

Results

Bonus awards
The following fighters were awarded $60,000 bonuses:
Fight of the Night: Robert Whittaker vs. Derek Brunson
Performance of the Night: Robert Whittaker and Tyson Pedro

See also

2016 in UFC
List of UFC events
Mixed martial arts in Australia

References

UFC Fight Night
2016 in mixed martial arts
Mixed martial arts in Australia
Sports competitions in Melbourne
2016 in Australian sport
November 2016 sports events in Australia